Dos Reales is a Mexican restaurant chain found in the Midwest and Great Plains of the United States. It operates as a franchise in the states of Kansas, Missouri and Illinois.

The first branch, located in Champaign, Illinois, was founded by Alvaro Quezada, his wife Leticia, and a group of friends and family.  Several years later, they began to expand operations into Illinois and into Kansas.  The staff and owners make regular visits to Mexico City for product research.

Today there are locations in Champaign, Illinois; Charleston, Illinois; Rockford, Illinois; Loves Park, Illinois; Columbia, Missouri; Kansas City, Kansas; Overland Park, Kansas and Shawnee, Kansas.  A location in Lenexa, Kansas closed in 2007 due to slow business and competition with the nearby Panzon's.  Another location in Urbana, Illinois closed under similar circumstances.

The location in Kansas City, Kansas is named Sol Azteca, and the location in Charleston, Illinois is named Los Potrillos, but they are owned by the same group and feature the same menu.

Dos Reales is best known for their Burrito Bravo: a large burrito. They also sell the cold cinnamon rice drink horchata. A complimentary dessert is provided along with a festive song and dance for birthday guests.

At the University of Illinois at Urbana-Champaign, Dos Reales is often shortened to "Dos".

External links
 Dos Reales web site for the Greater Kansas City Area

Restaurants in Illinois
Restaurants in Kansas
Economy of the Midwestern United States
Regional restaurant chains in the United States
Mexican restaurants in the United States